Astridia hallii is a species of plant in the family Aizoaceae. It is endemic to Namibia.  Its natural habitat is rocky areas.

References

Flora of Namibia
hallii
Least concern plants
Taxonomy articles created by Polbot
Taxa named by Louisa Bolus